Bantam Cock is the third studio album by Jake Thackray. It was produced by Norman Newell and released on LP by EMI in 1972. Musical direction was by Geoff Love. The album is currently out of print, but its songs, digitally remastered, are included in the 4-CD retrospective Jake in a Box.

Content
Bantam Cock features Thackray’s voice and acoustic guitar accompanied by double bass and electric guitar. The album is notable among Thackray’s catalogue for its jazz influence and inclusion of electric guitar solos; Thackray’s output had thus far been entirely acoustic.
"Brother Gorilla" is Thackray's English-language adaptation of the French song "Le Gorille" by Georges Brassens.

Reception
Upon release, the album was met with critical acclaim from music press. Record Mirror said "quite simply, and not to put too fine a point on it, Jake Thackray is a genius...there are some tremendous songs on this", while the Reading Evening Post agreed, saying "yet another brilliant record from the Yorkshire tyke". Retrospectively, Allmusic awarded the album four stars, citing the title track and "Sister Josephine" as "drop dead classics" and calling "Old Molly Metcalfe" the "most magical" of the album's highlights.

Legacy
The song "Bantam Cock" has been covered by Fred Wedlock, The Corries, Alex Beaton and Jasper Carrott. "Sister Josephine" has been covered by The Clancy Brothers, The Barron Knights, Colcannon and Robbie O'Connell. "Old Molly Metcalfe" has been covered by Tony Capstick and The Witches of Elswick.

Track listing

References

External links
Track listing and sleeve notes at jakethackray.com

Jake Thackray albums
1972 albums
Albums produced by Norman Newell
EMI Records albums